Generation is an album by saxophonist Dexter Gordon which was recorded in 1972 and released on the Prestige label.

Reception

Scott Yanow of AllMusic states, "Veteran tenor-saxophonist Dexter Gordon welcomed trumpeter Freddie Hubbard to his recording group several times during his career and each collaboration was quite rewarding.... This CD should please collectors".

Track listing 
 "Milestones" (John Lewis) – 8:56
 "Scared to Be Alone" (André Previn) – 7:39
 "We See" (Thelonious Monk) – 11:18
 "The Group" (Dexter Gordon) – 6:33 
 "Milestones" [alternate take] (Lewis) – 7:09 Bonus track on CD reissue

Personnel 
Dexter Gordon – tenor saxophone
Freddie Hubbard – trumpet, flugelhorn
Cedar Walton – piano
Buster Williams – bass
Billy Higgins – drums

References 

Dexter Gordon albums
1973 albums
Prestige Records albums
Albums produced by Ozzie Cadena
Albums recorded at Van Gelder Studio